OSCE is the Organization for Security and Co-operation in Europe, the world's largest security-oriented intergovernmental organization.

OSCE may also refer to:
Objective structured clinical examination, a modern type of examination in medicine, pharmacy and similar disciplines